Scott Becker (born 24 November 1984 in Ranfurly, New Zealand) is a New Zealand curler and curling coach.

Curling career
On international level he won silver on 2011 Pacific-Asia Curling Championships and won bronze on 2007 and 2008 Pacific Curling Championships. He played for New Zealand national men's team on one World Curling Championship and ten Pacific Curling Championships (2007, 2008, 2009, 2011, 2012, 2013, 2014, 2015, 2016, 2018). He played too for New Zealand national mixed doubles team on three World Mixed Doubles Curling Championship (2009, 2016, 2017).

On national level he is New Zealand men's champion (2007, 2008, 2009, 2011, 2014, 2015, 2017, 2018) and runner-up (2005, 2006, 2012). He is New Zealand mixed doubles champion (2008, 2015, 2016), runner-up (2007, 2014) and bronze (2009).

He was also coach of New Zealand national mixed doubles team on 2010 World Mixed Doubles Curling Championship (they won silver) and on 2011 World Mixed Doubles Curling Championship (they was 14th).

Personal life
Becker's family is well known as a curling family. Scott's mother, father, older brother, sister and grandfather have all represented New Zealand on an international scale. Scott's father, Peter Becker, is known as one of the first curlers to represent New Zealand internationally. He was also the coach of the women's team as well as the Secretary of the New Zealand Curling Association. Scott's older brother, Sean Becker, is one of the most successful and well known New Zealand curlers. Scott's sister, Bridget Becker has been the skip of the New Zealand women's national curling team. Married in 2019 to Jenna Becker.

References

External links

1984 births
Living people
New Zealand male curlers
People from Ranfurly, New Zealand
New Zealand curling champions
New Zealand sports coaches
New Zealand curling coaches
21st-century New Zealand people